Omni is a Latin prefix meaning "all" or "every".  Omni may also refer to:

Mormonism
 Omni (Book of Mormon prophet), a man in the Book of Mormon
 The Book of Omni, one of the books in the Book of Mormon

Vehicles
 Dodge Omni, a vehicle manufactured by Chrysler from 1978 to 1990
 Maruti Omni, a vehicle manufactured by Maruti Udyog in India

Organizations and businesses
 Omni Coliseum, a large indoor arena located in Atlanta, Georgia, demolished in 1997
 The Omni Group, a software developer
 Omni Hotels, a North American hotel chain
 Omni Air International, an American charter airline
 Omni - Aviacao e Tecnologia, a Portuguese charter airline
 Omni Superstore, former discount grocery store chain owned by Dominick's in the Chicago, Illinois market area
 Omni International Mall, in downtown Miami, Florida, closed in 2000
 Omni Bank (California), Chinese bank with branches in the U.S.
 Omnisport, a global news service providing multi-platform content to partners for use online, on mobile devices or broadcast media
 Omnitel, one of the largest telecommunication companies in the Baltics
 Omnitel Pronto-Italia, the former name of an Italian mobile telephony operator Vodafone Italy
 Omniva, international post and logistics company based in Estonia
 Omni (company), a San Francisco-based storage and rental company

Arts and entertainment
 Omni (album), an album by Minus the Bear
 Ømni, an album by Angra
 "Omni", a song by Scale the Summit from the album Monument
 Omni (magazine), a science and science fiction magazine published from 1978 to 1995
 Omni Television, a Canadian television network owned by Rogers Communications
 Omni, a fictional time travel device used in the 1980s TV series Voyagers!
 Omni, a fictional villain in the television series Power Rangers: S.P.D.
 The OmniBrain, a character in the computer game The Feeble Files
 Omni Trio, stage name of British drum and bass music artist Rob Haigh  Omniknight, a character in a PC MOBA game DotA
Omni (band), an American post-punk band from Atlanta
 Omni-Man, a character in the comic book series Invincible Omnitrix, a device in the Cartoon Network series Ben 10'' that allows the user to transform into various alien species.
 Omnimon, the way the western version of the anime series "Digimon" named the fused digital monster Omegamom.

Other uses
 OMNI (SCIP), a device for secure voice and data communications over telephone lines
 OmniWeb, a web browser developed by The Omni Group for the Mac OS X operating system
 Omni wheel, a design for a wheel
 Virtuix Omni, an omnidirectional treadmill for use with virtual reality gaming headsets like the Oculus Rift
 Omnichannel, a cross-channel business model that companies use to increase customer experience
 OMNI Entertainment System, a quiz based game system by MB Electronics
 Omni Television, a Canadian TV channel

See also
 Omnia (disambiguation)
 Omnis (disambiguation)
 
 
 OMNY, a fare payment system in New York City